The Drunkard is a 1935 American drama film directed by Albert Herman and starring James Murray, Clara Kimball Young and Janet Chandler. It is based on the 1844 stage melodrama The Drunkard by William H. Smith.

Cast

References

Bibliography
 A. T. McKenna. Showman of the Screen: Joseph E. Levine and His Revolutions in Film Promotion. University Press of Kentucky, 2016.

External links
 

1935 films
1935 drama films
American drama films
Films directed by Albert Herman
American black-and-white films
1930s English-language films
1930s American films